Poole Town Centre is an area of Poole, Dorset. It is just to the west of Poole Park. Poole Old Town is home to many historic buildings like the 15th-century Scaplen's Court, the 18th-century Custom House and the Victorian St James' Church.

History 

The Poole explosion of 1988 caused 3,500 people to be evacuated out of the town centre in the biggest peacetime evacuation the country had seen since the World War II.

In 2020, Bournemouth, Christchurch and Poole Council revealed plans for regeneration of the area with 25 million pounds for Poole High Street. Poole railway station could potentially be moved and rebuilt in a new location.

In November 2022, a sea-life mural dedicated to Philip Henry Gosse, the naturist pioneer who was raised in the town, was unveiled in Poole High Street.

Amenities 

 Dolphin Shopping Centre
 The Lighthouse
 Poole Harbour
 Poole Bus Station
 Poole Museum

Politics 
Poole Town Centre is part of the Poole parliamentary constituency.

Poole Town (ward) for Bournemouth, Christchurch and Poole Council.

References

External links 

 Poole-town-centre-regeneration

Areas of Poole
Central business districts in the United Kingdom